Coatzintla is a municipality in the Mexican state of Veracruz.

The municipality of Coatzintla is delimited to the north by Tihuatlán and Poza Rica, to the east by Papantla, to the west by the state of Puebla and to the south-west by Coyutla.

It produces principally maize and potatoes.

Each July in Coatzintla a celebration is held to honor to Señor Santiago, Patron of the town.

The weather in Coatzintla is warm all year with rain in summer and autumn.

References

External links 
  Municipal Official webpage
  Municipal Official Information

Municipalities of Veracruz